Piveh Zhan Rural District is a rural district (dehestan) in Ahmadabad District, Mashhad County, Razavi Khorasan province, Iran. At the 2006 census, its population was 17,262, in 4,720 families.  The rural district has 31 villages.

References 

Rural Districts of Razavi Khorasan Province
Mashhad County